Two ships of the Royal Australian Navy have been named HMAS Bathurst, for the city of Bathurst, New South Wales.

 , lead ship of the Bathurst-class corvettes, launched in 1940 and sold for scrap in 1948
 , an Armidale-class patrol boat commissioned in 2006 and active as of 2016

Battle honours
Two battle honours have been awarded to ships named HMAS Bathurst:
 Indian Ocean 1942–44
 Pacific 1945

References

Royal Australian Navy ship names